The Quiksilver Pro Gold Coast 2015 was an event of the Association of Surfing Professionals for 2015 ASP World Tour.

This event was held from 28 February to 13 March at Gold Coast, (Queensland, Australia) and contested by 36 surfers.

The tournament was won by Filipe Toledo (BRA), who beat Julian Wilson (AUS) in final.

Round 1

Round 2

Round 3

Round 4

Round 5

Quarter finals

Semi finals

Final

References

Surfing competitions
2015 World Surf League
2015 in Australian sport
Sport on the Gold Coast, Queensland
Quiksilver Pro Gold Coast